AstroPrint is a cloud platform and application marketplace designed for consumer 3D printing by 3DaGoGo Inc., a private San Diego-based technology company. 

AstroPrint develops software to enable the management of desktop 3D printers from any web enabled device, without requiring any technical expertise. 

AstroPrint claims to be a unifying software platform in the fragmented consumer 3D Printing space.

Background

In May 2014, while part of the Betaspring seed accelerator, AstroPrint successfully raised $40,314 and met its funding goal in a single day using the crowdfunding platform Kickstarter. Subsequently, AstroPrint attended and graduated from the 500 Startups seed accelerator in Mountain View, CA.

AstroPrint maintains partnerships with National Institutes of Health, 3D Hubs, i.materialise and 3D Slash.

3D printer manufacturer Airwolf 3D ships 3D Printers with AstroPrint software integrated.

Investors of AstroPrint include Dave McClure, Will Bunker, Dave Hodson (Co-Founder & CTO of MessageCast Inc.) and Christine Tsai.

On May 8th, 2017, AstroPrint met its funding goal on the crowdfunding website Kickstarter for the AstroBox Touch, a cloud-enabled touchscreen for desktop 3D Printing. The campaign ended with 603 backers raising $74,781 to bring the AstroBox Touch to life. With the Kickstarter, AstroPrint also released desktop and mobile apps along with a public API to enhance the 3D printing experience on the platform.

Media coverage
On May 18, 2015, AstroPrint won the Editors Choice award by Maker Faire & Make Magazine.

On July 27, 2015, San Diego Business Journal wrote that AstroPrint was instrumental in enabling Dr. Peter Manning at the National Institutes of Health in printing 3-dimensional models of a two-year-old boy's heart and the network of vessels that caused his breathing problems. AstroPrint reduced the hundreds of settings usually required by 3D printers to three.

Tech Cocktail named AstroPrint under 3D Printing for "The Top 5 Technologies VCs Will Fund in 2015".

On January 5, 2016, AstroPrint unveiled a joint project with $3 billion technology giant Marvell at CES 2016 in Las Vegas, Nevada. The project involved the designing of a consumer-friendly 3D printer containing embedded software by AstroPrint using the Kinoma platform. According to journalists and media personnel, the printer was only accessible on an invite-only basis in a private ballroom within CES.

In May 2017, AstroPrint's second successful crowdfunding campaign was covered on the San Diego Business Journal, Solidsmack, NBC, Fabbaloo, Inside3DPrinting, 3DPrint.com, and All3DP.

In October 2017, AstroPrint released cross-platform mobile and desktop apps for desktop 3D printing.  

On November 10th, 2017, AstroPrint released Toy Maker, a mobile app that allows children to 3D print toys at home. Toy Maker was also used to demonstrate the content delivery capabilities of the AstroPrint platform.

Technical specifications
AstroPrint takes a user's uploaded STL file, adds supports, slices it, and saves the g-code in the user's account online. The user can then access, download, modify, and print their models wirelessly via their 3D printer. AstroPrint is built with a combination of 3D printing software, such as Cura, Repetier-Host, Slic3r, and OctoPrint.

AstroPrint also allows users to remotely monitor their 3D printer in real time from any web-enabled device.

AstroPrint is compatible with most consumer 3D printers and its AstroBox Gateway's Open source software can be run on a Raspberry Pi.

AstroPrint has also released cross-platform mobile and desktop software to manage 3D printers.

In addition, developers are able to use AstroPrint's API to develop third party applications for 3D printer owners on the AstroPrint platform. 

AstroPrint is aimed at the general, non-technical consumer as it is a plug and play, all-inclusive platform for 3D printing that does not require any technical understanding.

See also

3D Printing Marketplace

References

External links
AstroPrint's Official Website

3D printer companies
Cloud clients
Cross-platform software
Technology companies based in San Diego